The Elbe (or Elv; Upper and ) is one of the major rivers of Central Europe.

The Elbe's major tributaries include the rivers Vltava, Saale, Havel, Mulde, Schwarze Elster, and Ohře.

The basin spans four countries, however it lies almost entirely just in two of them, Germany (65.5%) and the Czech Republic (33.7%, covering about two thirds of the state's territory). Marginally, the basin stretches also to Austria (0.6%) and Poland (0.2%). The Elbe catchment area is inhabited by 24.4 million people, the biggest cities within are Berlin, Hamburg, Prague, Dresden and Leipzig.

Etymology
 
Old Norse river name , Swedish  "river", Norwegian  "river", Old English river name , and Middle Low German  "river-bed".

Course

In the Czech Republic
Of the numerous small streams whose waters compose the infant river.

Here the Elbe enters the vast vale named Polabí (meaning "land along the Elbe"), and continues on southwards through Hradec Králové (where Orlice flows in) and then to Pardubice, where it turns sharply to the west. At Kolín some  further on, it bends gradually towards the north-west. At the village of Káraný, a little above Brandýs nad Labem, the Jizera enters in.

At Mělník its stream is more than doubled in volume by the Vltava, a major river which winds northwards through Bohemia. Upstream from the confluence the Vltava is in fact much longer ( against  of the Elbe so far), and has a greater discharge and a larger drainage basin. Nonetheless, for historical reasons the river retains the name Elbe, also because at the confluence point it is the Elbe that flows through the main, wider valley while the Vltava flows into the valley to meet the Elbe at almost a right angle, and thus appears to be the tributary river.

Some distance lower down, at Litoměřice, the waters of the Elbe are tinted by the reddish Ohře.

In Germany
Shortly after crossing the Czech-German frontier, and passing through the sandstone defiles of the Elbe Sandstone Mountains, the stream assumes a north-westerly direction, which on the whole it preserves right to the North Sea.

The river rolls through Dresden and finally, beyond Meissen, enters on its long journey across the North German Plain passing along the former western border of East Germany, touching Torgau, Wittenberg, Dessau, Magdeburg, Wittenberge, and Hamburg on the way, and taking on the waters of the Mulde and Saale from the west, and those of the Schwarze Elster, Havel and Elde from the east. In its northern section both banks of the Elbe are characterised by flat, very fertile marshlands (Elbe Marshes), former flood plains of the Elbe now diked.

At Magdeburg  there is a  viaduct, the Magdeburg Water Bridge, that carries a canal and its shipping traffic over the Elbe and its banks, allowing shipping traffic to pass under it unhindered.

From the sluice of Geesthacht (at kilometre 586) on downstream the Elbe is subject to the tides, the tidal Elbe section is called the Unterelbe (Low Elbe). Soon the Elbe reaches Hamburg. Within the city-state the Unterelbe has a number of branch streams, such as Dove Elbe, Gose Elbe, Köhlbrand, Norderelbe (Northern Elbe), Reiherstieg, Süderelbe (Southern Elbe). Some of which have been disconnected for vessels from the main stream by dikes. In 1390 the Gose Elbe (literally in ) was separated from the main stream by a dike connecting the two then-islands of Kirchwerder and Neuengamme. The Dove Elbe (literally in ) was diked off in 1437/38 at Gammer Ort. These hydraulic engineering works were carried out to protect marshlands from inundation, and to improve the water supply of the Port of Hamburg. After the heavy inundation by the North Sea flood of 1962 the western section of the Southern Elbe was separated, becoming the Old Southern Elbe, while the waters of the eastern Southern Elbe now merge into the Köhlbrand, which is bridged by the Köhlbrandbrücke, the last bridge over the Elbe before the North Sea.

The Northern Elbe passes the Elbe Philharmonic Hall and is then crossed under by the old Elbe Tunnel (Alter Elbtunnel), both in Hamburg's city centre. A bit more downstream the Low Elbe's two main anabranches Northern Elbe and the Köhlbrand reunite south of Altona-Altstadt, a locality of Hamburg. Right after both anabranches reunited the Low Elbe is passed under by the New Elbe Tunnel (Neuer Elbtunnel), the last structural road link crossing the river before the North Sea. At the bay Mühlenberger Loch in Hamburg at kilometre 634, the Northern Elbe and the Southern Elbe (here now the cut-off meander Old Southern Elbe) used to reunite, which is why the bay is seen as the starting point of the Niederelbe (Lower Elbe). Leaving the city-state the Lower Elbe then passes between Holstein and the Elbe-Weser Triangle with Stade until it flows into the North Sea at Cuxhaven. Near its mouth it passes the entrance to the Kiel Canal at Brunsbüttel before it debouches into the North Sea.

Towns and cities

Navigation
The Elbe has always been navigable by commercial vessels, and provides important trade links as far inland as Prague. The river is linked by canals (Elbe Lateral Canal, Elbe-Havel Canal, Mittellandkanal) to the industrial areas of Germany and to Berlin. The Elbe-Lübeck Canal links the Elbe to the Baltic Sea, as does the Kiel Canal, whose western entrance is near the mouth of the Elbe. The Elbe-Weser Shipping Channel connects the Elbe with the Weser.

By the Treaty of Versailles the navigation on the Elbe became subject to the International Commission of the Elbe, seated in Dresden. The statute of the commission was signed in Dresden on 22 February 1922. Following articles 363 and 364 of the Treaty of Versailles, Czechoslovakia was entitled to lease its own harbour basin, Moldauhafen in Hamburg. The contract of lease with Germany, and supervised by the United Kingdom, was signed on 14 February 1929, ending in 2028. Since 1993 the Czech Republic holds the former Czechoslovak legal position.

Before Germany was reunited, waterway transport in Western Germany was hindered by the fact that inland navigation to Hamburg had to pass through the German Democratic Republic. The Elbe-Seitenkanal (Elbe Lateral Canal) was built between the West German section of the Mittellandkanal and the Lower Elbe to restore this connection. When the two nations were reunited, works were begun to improve and restore the original links: the Magdeburg Water Bridge now allows large barges to cross the Elbe without having to enter the river. The often low water levels of the Elbe no longer hinder navigation to Berlin.

Islands

Headwaters
 Hořejší – in Kolín  
 Kmochův – in Kolín

Upper reaches
 Pillnitzer Elbinsel – in Dresden's southern quarter of Pillnitz in the Dresden Basin
 Gauernitzer Elbinsel – east of Gauernitz in the Dresden Basin between Dresden and Meißen

Middle Elbe
 Rotehorninsel – in Magdeburg
 Steinkopfinsel – in Magdeburg

Between Northern and Southern Elbe (Norderelbe/Süderelbe)
 Wilhelmsburg, including the islands Veddel, Georgswerder, Kleiner Grasbrook, Steinwerder, Peute and several more – in Hamburg's borough of Mitte (centre)
 Kaltehofe (also "Kalte Hofe") – in Hamburg's borough of Mitte
 Finkenwerder – in Hamburg's borough of Mitte

Lower Elbe
 Schweinesand – south of Blankenese (Hamburg)
 Neßsand – south of Tinsdal
 Hahnöfersand – north of Jork
 Hanskalbsand – south of Schulau
 Lühesand – east of Stade
 Bisterhorster Sand – west of Wedel
 Pagensand – west of Seestermühe
 Schwarztonnensand – east of Drochtersen
 Rhinplate – west of Glückstadt

Outer Elbe (estuary)
 Neuwerk – an exclave – in Hamburg's borough of Mitte
 Scharhörn – an exclave Hamburg's borough of Mitte
 Nigehörn – an exclave Hamburg's borough of Mitte

Former islands
 Medemsand

Ferries

The Elbe is crossed by many ferries, both passenger and car carrying. In downstream order, these include:
Dolní Žleb Ferry, at Dolní Žleb part of Děčín
Rathen Ferry, at Rathen
Pillnitz Kleinzschachwitz Ferry, in the eastern suburbs of Dresden
Laubegast Niederpoyritz Ferry, in Dresden
Johannstadt Neustadt Ferry, in Dresden
Belgern Ottersitz Ferry, between Belgern and Ottersitz
Dommitzsch Prettin Ferry, between Dommitzsch and Prettin
Mauken Pretzsch Ferry, between Mauken and Pretzsch
Wartenburg Elster Ferry, between Wartenburg and Elster
Wörlitz Coswig Ferry, between Wörlitz and Coswig
Steutz Aken Ferry, between Steutz and Aken
Tochheim Ferry, between Tochheim and Alt Tochheim near Breitenhagen
Ronney Barby Ferry, between Barby and Walternienburg
Westerhüsen Ferry, at Westerhüsen near Magdeburg
Schartau Rogätz Ferry, between Schartau and Rogätz
Ferchland Grieben Ferry, between Ferchland and Grieben
Sandau Büttnershof Ferry, between Sandau and Büttnershof
Räbel Havelberg Ferry, between Räbel and Havelberg
Lenzen Pevestorf Ferry, between Lenzen and Pevestorf
Neu Darchau Darchau Ferry, between Darchau and Neu Darchau
, between Bleckede and Neu Bleckede
Zollenspieker Ferry, between Kirchwerder a part of the Bergedorf borough  of Hamburg, and Hoopte, part of the town Winsen (Luhe), in the state of Lower Saxony, about 30 kilometres (19 mi) south-east of Hamburg centre
Ferries in the port of Hamburg, operated by HADAG
, between Wischhafen and Glückstadt to the west of Hamburg
, between Brunsbüttel and Cuxhaven at the mouth of the river (out of service as of October 2022).

Many of these ferries are traditional reaction ferries, a type of cable ferry that uses the current flow of the river to provide propulsion.

Prehistory 

Humans first lived in the northern Elbe region before about 200,000 years ago, during the Middle Paleolithic.

History

The Elbe has long served as an important delineator of European geography. In the Middle Ages the Elbe formed the eastern limit of the Empire of Charlemagne (King of the Franks from 769 to 814). The river's navigable sections were essential to the success of the Hanseatic League in the Late Middle Ages, and much trade was carried on its waters.

From the early 6th century Slavic tribes (known as the Polabian Slavs) settled in the areas east of the rivers Elbe and Saale (which had been depopulated since the 4th century). In the 10th century the Ottonian Dynasty (dominant from 919 to 1024) began conquering these lands; a slow process of Germanization ensued, including the Wendish Crusade of 1147.

The Elbe delineated the western parts of Germany from the eastern so-called East Elbia, where soccage and serfdom were more strict and prevailed longer than westwards of the river, and where feudal lords held bigger estates than in the west. Thus incumbents of huge land-holdings became characterised as East Elbian Junkers. The Northern German area north of the Lower Elbe used to be called North Albingia in the Middle Ages. When the four Lutheran church bodies there united in 1977 they chose the name North Elbian Evangelical Lutheran Church. Other, administrative units were named after the river Elbe, such as the Westphalian Elbe département (1807–1813) and Lower Elbe département (1810), and the French département Bouches-de-l'Elbe (1811–1814).

On 10 April 1945, General Wenck of the German Twelfth Army located to the west of Berlin to guard against the advancing American and British forces. But, as the Western Front moved eastwards and the Eastern Front moved westwards, the German armies making up both fronts backed towards each other. As a result, the area of control of Wenck's army to his rear and east of the Elbe River had become a vast refugee camp for Germans fleeing from the approaching Soviet Army. Wenck took great pains to provide food and lodging for these refugees. At one stage, the Twelfth Army was estimated to be feeding more than a quarter of a million people every day. During the night of 28 April, Wenck reported to the German Supreme Army Command in Fuerstenberg that his Twelfth Army had been forced back along the entire front. According to Wenck, no attack on Berlin was possible as support from Busse's Ninth Army could no longer be expected. Instead, starting April 24, Wenck moved his army towards the Forest of Halbe, broke into the Halbe pocket and linked up with the remnants of the Ninth Army, Hellmuth Reymann's "Army Group Spree," and the Potsdam garrison. Wenck brought his army, remnants of the Ninth Army, and many civilian refugees across the Elbe and into territory occupied by the U.S. Army.

In 1945, as World War II drew to a close, Germany came under attack from the armies of the western Allies advancing from the west and those of the Soviet Union advancing from the east. On 25 April 1945 these two forces linked up near Torgau, on the Elbe. The victorious countries marked the event unofficially as Elbe Day. From 1949 to 1990 the Elbe formed part of the Inner German border between East Germany and West Germany.

During the 1970s the Soviet Union stated that Adolf Hitler's ashes had been scattered in the Elbe following disinterment from their original burial-site.

See also
 2002 European floods
 2006 European floods
 2013 European floods
 Saxon Elbeland, the region of the Upper Elbe in Germany
 List of waterbodies in Saxony-Anhalt

References

Bibliography

External links

 

 
 Elbe
Rivers of the Hradec Králové Region
Rivers of the Central Bohemian Region
Rivers of the Pardubice Region
Rivers of the Ústí nad Labem Region
International rivers of Europe
Rivers of Brandenburg
Rivers of Hamburg
Rivers of Lower Saxony
Rivers of Mecklenburg-Western Pomerania
Rivers of Saxony
Rivers of Saxony-Anhalt
Rivers of Schleswig-Holstein
Inner German border
Federal waterways in Germany
Rivers of Germany
Rivers of the Czech Republic